Pragel Pass (el. 1548 m.) is a high mountain pass in the Swiss Alps between the cantons of Schwyz and Glarus between Muotathal and Netstal. The pass itself is located in the canton of Schwyz.

The pass road is parallel to the road over Klausen Pass and has a maximum grade of 18 percent. The east side of the pass road is closed to motorized vehicles on Saturdays and Sundays, which makes it ideal for bikers.

See also
 List of highest paved roads in Europe
 List of mountain passes
List of the highest Swiss passes

External links 
Profile of ascent from Reidern on climbbybike.com
Profile of ascent from Muotathal on climbbybike.com

Mountain passes of Switzerland
Mountain passes of the Alps
Mountain passes of the canton of Schwyz